Alexander James Jeffery Horne (born 10 September 1978) is a British comedian. Horne is the creator of  BAFTA award-winning TV series Taskmaster, in which he also performs as the Taskmaster's assistant. He is the host and bandleader of The Horne Section, a comedic band. Horne runs the band's eponymous podcast and has appeared with them on their music variety show on BBC Radio 4 and TV channel Dave.

He was a contestant on the numbers and letters show Countdown in 2008, and has been a dictionary corner guest many times on 8 Out of 10 Cats Does Countdown with his band.

Early life

Horne was educated at independent Lancing College (1991–1996) and at Sidney Sussex College, Cambridge, where he studied classics, graduating in 2001. While at Cambridge he was a member of the Footlights.

Career
He made his first appearance at the Edinburgh Festival Fringe in 2000 with his show, "How To Avoid Huge Ships".  His 2003 Edinburgh show, "Making Fish Laugh" was nominated for a Perrier newcomer award.  In 2004 he won a Chortle Award for Best Breakthrough Act.  His shows with Tim Key have been "Every Body Talks" and "When in Rome", both of which featured unusually extensive use of Microsoft PowerPoint for a comic act. Horne toured Roman towns of the UK with the "When in Rome" show in early 2006.

As a solo performer, Horne wrote and performed "Birdwatching" at the 2007 Edinburgh Festival and "Wordwatching" at the 2008 Edinburgh Festival. He signed a two-book deal with Virgin Publishing to write up both of these stories as books. The first, entitled Birdwatchingwatching, came out early in 2009. The second came out in early 2010.

On 18 January 2007, Horne became the first comedian to perform in Second Life for a feature on Sky News. Between 24 October 2006 and 24 October 2007 he worked alongside fellow comedian Owen Powell, in an attempt to find a person from every nationality living in London. After a year's search, they finally managed to meet people from 189 of the UN's 192 countries, and hence suggested there is nobody in the city from Tuvalu, Palau, or the Marshall Islands.

Since 2010, Horne has also been performing with his band The Horne Section as the compere of comedy variety shows. Alex Horne Presents The Horne Section (2012–14) ran for three series on BBC Radio 4, and The Horne Section Podcast has streamed since 2018.

Horne, along with Tim Key and Mark Watson, created the YouTube series "No More Jockeys" during the 2020 coronavirus lockdown in the UK, itself based upon their earlier BBC web series "No More Women". Horne also hosts the YouTube channel Bad Golf with John Robins.

Television work

Horne appeared as a contestant on Countdown in August 2008, winning three matches before being defeated. He also won the inaugural Comedians' Countdown Competition held at the Edinburgh Festival Fringe in the same month, beating Mark Watson and Stephen Grant to lift the trophy.

Horne acted as the on-stage expert responsible for graphics and sound-effects on the quiz show We Need Answers on BBC Four, in 2009 and 2010.

In 2011, Horne appeared on BBC One's Celebrity Mastermind. His specialist subject was the comedian Ken Dodd. He finished in 2nd place with a score of 25. During Comic Relief 2011's 24 Hour Panel People marathon, Horne appeared on the Call My Bluff segment, on a team with Tim Key and Roisin Conaty. Horne also appeared in the TV show on BBC Three called Britain in Bed in 2011. He appeared as a guest on The Matt Lucas Awards on 16 April 2013 where he won "The Bravest Guest" Award. He has appeared eight times on 8 Out of 10 Cats Does Countdown, seven as a Dictionary Corner guest, and once as a replacement for Joe Wilkinson. He has appeared twice as a contestant on The Chase on ITV.

On 26 November 2012, Horne chaired Never Mind the Buzzcocks on BBC Two. The Horne Section performed behind him at various points during the quiz, and played songs about guests Louis Smith, Josh Widdicombe and Paloma Faith.

Since 2015, Horne has served as co-host alongside Greg Davies in the series Taskmaster, which he created. The series was originally broadcast on Dave, and transferred to Channel 4 in 2020. In 2018, Horne co-hosted the US remake of the show, which carried a shorter, but similar format to the UK series. Versions of the programme have also been made in Australia, Belgium, Croatia, Sweden, Norway, Denmark, Spain, Portugal, Finland and New Zealand.  The show was awarded with a BAFTA for its 9th series in 2020.

In April 2018, Horne voiced a talking Button in the BBC One's game show The Button.

In May 2018, Horne presented The Horne Section Television Programme, a musical comedy stage show based on his BBC Radio 4 show, The Horne Section. The show was recorded for UKTV in front of a live audience at the London Palladium and aired on Dave on 24 May. The show featured his band—The Horne Section—as well as performances from comedians Sue Perkins, Sara Pascoe and Joe Wilkinson, drag act and opera singer Le Gateau Chocolat, and Girls Aloud singer Nadine Coyle.

A Channel 4 six-part programme The Horne Section TV Show was released on 3 November 2022. It is scripted and combines elements of musical comedy, talk show and sitcom.

Personal life
Horne is married to former BBC business journalist Rachel Horne who now works on the Chris Evans breakfast show at Virgin Radio. The couple has three sons. He is a birdwatcher, which he describes as the perfect activity "for someone who likes sport but is getting too old to play, likes the outdoors and is slightly anal". He is a supporter of Liverpool F.C. and is a director of his local team Chesham United F.C..

Filmography

Bibliography

References

External links

 
Alex Horne's website
Blog with Owen Powell
Bad Golf

1978 births
Living people
Alumni of Sidney Sussex College, Cambridge
British comedians
People educated at Lancing College
People from Chichester
Male actors from Sussex
Comedians from West Sussex
Birdwatchers
Taskmaster (TV series)